BRP Dionisio Ojeda (PC-117) was a Tomas Batilo-class fast attack craft of the Philippine Navy. It was part of the second batch transferred by the South Korean government in 2006. It was formally commissioned with the Philippine Navy in 2007.

From 6 September 2009, the ship took part in rescue and search & rescue operations for survivors from the sinking of SuperFerry 9 off the coast of Zamboanga del Norte.

The ship took part in the Exercise SEACAT 2011 between Philippine and US navies as part of Naval Task Force 61 between 14 and 24 of June 2011.

In April 2016, in line with the Philippine Navy Standard Operating Procedures #08, the boat was reclassified as the patrol craft BRP Dionisio Ojeda (PC-117).

Two months later in June 2016, PC-117 was retired from service after 9 years of service and struck off the Philippine Navy ship register.

On the 21st of November 2018 the Ship was sunk as a target by the Philippine Navy's MPAC weapon system along with two target boxes as part of the Navy's weapon demonstration of SPIKE ER.

Gallery

References

External links
 Philippine Navy Official website

 

Patrol vessels of the Philippine Navy
1970s ships